"Nelson's Farewell" is the first single by The Dubliners, released in 1966 on the label Transatlantic Records. The song charted at No.6 in the Irish Charts. The origin of the song is about the bomb blast that destroyed Nelson's Pillar in central Dublin in March 1966. It was featured in the album Finnegan Wakes.

Charts

References

The Dubliners songs
1966 singles
1966 songs